Hossam al-Katerji (born 1982), also known as Hossam Katerji, is a Syrian businessman and member of the People's Assembly of Syria, Syria's parliament. He is the proprietor of Katerji Group and involved in the petroleum industry in Syria. He was elected at the 2020 Syrian parliamentary election. He is sanctioned by the European Union in 2019 for his links to the Assad regime, as he "supports and benefits from the regime through enabling, and profiting from, trade deals with the regime in relation to oil and wheat."

Katerji has been described as a member of a new class of brokers that has arose during the Syrian Civil War that move goods between areas held by the Syrian regime, rebels, and ISIL.

References 

Members of the People's Assembly of Syria
Syrian businesspeople
Living people
1982 births
Syrian oligarchs
Syrian individuals subject to the European Union sanctions
Sanctioned due to Syrian civil war